Vukwi is a village in the North-East District of Botswana. In 2001, the population was 263. In 2011, the population was 369.

References

North-East District (Botswana)
Villages in Botswana